Hussein Ali (born 1 March 2002) is a Swedish professional footballer who plays as a right-back for Eredivisie club Heerenveen.

Club career
On 19 July 2022, Ali joined Heerenveen in the Netherlands on a three-year contract.

International career
Born in Sweden, Ali is of Iraqi descent. He is a youth international for Sweden.

References

2002 births
Living people
Swedish footballers
Sweden youth international footballers
Sweden under-21 international footballers
Swedish people of Iraqi descent
Association football defenders
Örebro SK players
SC Heerenveen players
Allsvenskan players
Superettan players
Footballers from Malmö
Swedish expatriate footballers
Expatriate footballers in the Netherlands
Swedish expatriate sportspeople in the Netherlands